The Clive Lloyd Trophy is a cricket trophy that is awarded to the winner of Test series between West Indies and Zimbabwe. The Trophy was first contested in a two-Test series in Zimbabwe in 2001, though the two sides did play one series before the naming of the Trophy during the 1999/2000 season, another two-Test series the West Indies won 2-0. West Indies won the 2017-18 season Test series 1-0.

List of Test series

References

See also
West Indies cricket team
Zimbabwe national cricket team
Zimbabwean cricket team in the West Indies in 1999–2000
West Indian cricket team in Zimbabwe in 2001
West Indian cricket team in Zimbabwe in 2003–04
Zimbabwean cricket team in the West Indies in 2012–13

Test cricket competitions
Cricket awards and rankings